Monty Python's Life of Brian is the second soundtrack album by Monty Python, released in 1979 alongside the film of the same name. It contains scenes from the film interrupted by linking sections performed by Eric Idle and Graham Chapman, who also acted as producers following an aborted attempt at a soundtrack album by Michael Palin. The album opens with a brief rendition of "Hava Nagila" on Scottish bagpipes, which had earlier been considered for use in a scene later cut from the film.

In common with the controversy surrounding the film, the album was banned in Ireland after Father Brian D'Arcy highlighted how it had worked its way through a loophole in the country's censorship laws, claiming "Anybody who buys the record and finds it funny must have something wrong with their mentality". Nevertheless, the album reached No.63 in the UK Albums Chart.

A 7" single (K17495) Double A-side of "Brian"/"Always Look on the Bright Side of Life" was released in the UK on 16 November 1979 to promote the album.

In 2006 a special edition CD added six bonus tracks comprising outtakes, demos and publicity material to the end of the album.

Part of the studio linking material was later used in the 2012 animated film A Liar's Autobiography: The Untrue Story of Monty Python's Graham Chapman.

A limited edition picture disc of the album was released on 13 April 2019, as part of Record Store Day.

Track listing

Side One
Introduction
Brian Song
The Wise Men at the Manger
Brian Song (cont.)
Sermon on the Mount (Big Nose)
Stone Salesman
Stoning
Ex-Leper
You Mean You Were Raped? (Nortius Maximus)
Revolutionaries in the Amphitheatre (Loretta)
Romans Go Home
What Have The Romans Ever Done For Us?
Ben
Brian Before Pilate (Thwow Him to the Floor)

Side Two
Prophets
Beard Salesman
Brian's Prophecy
The Hermit
He's Not the Messiah, He's a Very Naughty Boy
Pilate Sentences Brian
Nisus Wettus
Pilate with the Crowd (Welease Wodger)
Nisus Wettus with the Gaolers
Release Brian
Not So Bad Once You're Up
Revs Salute Brian
Cheeky is Released
"Look on the Bright Side of Life (All Things Dull and Ugly)"

2006 Bonus Tracks
Otto Sketch
Otto Song
Otto Song Demo (Python Sings)
Brian Song [Alternate Version]
Radio Ad - Record Shop
Radio Ad - Twice As Good

Charts

Certifications

References

Life of Brian
1979 soundtrack albums
Warner Records soundtracks
Comedy film soundtracks